Petru Păduraru (born Ion Chirilovici Păduraru ; October 24, 1946, Țiganca) is a Bessarabian priest and the current Metropolitan of Bessarabia.

Biography 
Petru Păduraru was born on October 24, 1946 in Țiganca, Moldavian SSR.

He has been the Metropolitan of Bessarabia since October 3, 1995.

Awards
 The , Grand Officer rank (2008)
 Medal of the Ecumenical Patriarchate of Constantinople (1993)
 Romanian Cultural Foundation Award for contributions to affirming the Romanian identity of Romanians in Bessarabia (1996)
 Honorary Citizen of the city of Galați (2000)

See also 
 List of members of the Holy Synod of the Romanian Orthodox Church
 Metropolis of Bessarabia 
 St. Teodora de la Sihla Church

Bibliography 
 Jurnal Moskovskoi Patriarhii, nr. 9/1990, p. 33-35 - Numirea și hirotonirea arhimandritului Petru (Păduraru) întru episcop de Bălți; 
 Alfa și Omega, nr. 17/1995, p. 1 and 3 - A fost ales Mitropolitul Basarabiei și Mitropolitul Petru, date biografice.

External links 
 Biography on the Metropolis of Bessarabia site
  Ortho-rus.ru - Петр (Пэдурару)

Notes

1948 births
Romanian people of Moldovan descent
Living people
People from Cantemir District
Moldovan priests
Metropolitans of Bessarabia
Recipients of the Order of Honour (Moldova)
Christians in Moldova
Recipients of the Order of Cultural Merit (Romania)